Lorum (also Romanized as Lorūm) is a village in Dikleh Rural District, Hurand District, Ahar County, East Azerbaijan province, Iran. At the 2006 census, its population was 397, in 83 families.

References 

Populated places in Ahar County